Jalalpore is a city and a Municipality in Navsari district in the Indian state of Gujarat. Jalalpore comes under Surat Metropolitan Region

Demographics
 India census, Jalalpore had a population of 16,246. Males constitute 52% of the population and females 48%. Jalalpore has an average literacy rate of 89%, higher than the national average of 59.5% and Gujarat's 79.4%, and ranking 3rd highest among 252 taluka in Gujarat male literacy is 92%, and female literacy is 86%. In Jalalpore, 12% of the population is under 6 years of age.

References

Cities and towns in Navsari district